Trigonoorda is a genus of moths of the family Crambidae.

Species
Trigonoorda gavisalis (Walker, 1869)
Trigonoorda iebelealis Munroe, 1974
Trigonoorda psarochroa (Turner, 1908)
Trigonoorda rhodea (Lower, 1905)
Trigonoorda rhodopa (Turner, 1908)
Trigonoorda triangularis Munroe, 1974
Trigonoorda trygoda (Meyrick, 1897)

References

Natural History Museum Lepidoptera genus database

Eurrhypini
Crambidae genera
Taxa named by Eugene G. Munroe